Kanchanbari is a village in Kumarghat subdistrict, under Unakoti district in the state of Tripura, in India. This progressive village is located 28 km to the south of the district headquarters at Kailasahar and 91 km from the state capital at Agartala. The village has a population of 6,649 people.

Etymology
The name Kanchanbari was derived from Kanchanbrabhadebi, the queen of Tripura. Revenue collected from Kanchanbari was deposited in the queen's treasury. There is a big lake named Kanchanmala Dighi.

History of Kanchanbari
Before 1927, Kanchanbari was a land with wild animals. Some tribal people, likely Kuki people and others, used to live in the hamlet. The land was purchased by Babu Chand Singha. At that time Babu Chand Singha purchased the land from two persons: Habibulla Choudhury, whose land number was 33 and area was 500 drun, and Akbar Ali, whose land number was 34 and area was 600 drun. Afterwards he took the responsibility of taluk number 45 from the Sarkar Bahadur. Before that, Babu Chand Singha used to live in a small village named Kamarkandi situated near the famous pilgrim site of Unakoti. Kamarkandi was the birthplace of his son, Chandra Sing Choudhury. Tring is a Tripura calendar which was followed by the Kings of Tripura at that time. Chnadra Singha Choudhury had a hearty relationship with the then kings, Birbikram Kishore Manikya Bahadur. According to some documentary evidence, Birbikram Kishor Manikya could not neglect the invitation of Chandra Sing Choudhury, who built a new residence for the king in 1927 (1339 Tring) and stayed there for one night. Other evidence shows that the then-king of Tripura requested Chandra Sing Choudhury, the second officer, to send his autobiography along with his photo. According to this, Chandra Sing Choudhury (Talukdar) was invited to attend at the birthday celebration of the Kumar Kirit Bikram Choudhury in 1940 (1350 Tring) at 3 pm. In 1927 (1337 Tring), the King of Tripura, Birbikram Choudhury, visited his Kailashahar Division and there he named this pargana Birchandra Nagar. Dhana Singha Choudhury's father was Chandra Singha. After the death of Babu Chand Singha, Chandra Singh Choudhury became the Landlord (Choudhury) of Birchandranagar Pargana. At that time Tripura was divided between many parganas, with Birchandra Nagar Pargana (presently Kanchanbari) one of them.

Educational history of Kanchanbari
The Choudhurys were interested in developing the pargana's educational system from 1939 (1339 Tring), before the merger of Tripura with India. When World War Two started, a lover of education named Rajbihari Singha came forward to spread education in the area. He was its first teacher, with Rs 3 as his monthly salary. The Dhana Singh Choudhury Memorial H S School (previously Kanchanbari School) is a well-known government institution in the Kumarghat Block of Unakoti District in Tripura. The school, which is located at Kanchanbari, was founded in 1954 with a primary section. In the early 1960s, it was renovated to a high school to meet the demands of the local and neighbouring community. In the year 1981, the school was upgraded to the current higher secondary level. Today, DSCM H S School is an important element in providing education to the children of Kanchanbari and the surrounding area, which includes parts of Unakoti and Dhalai District of Tripura. The school is situated on a 4.91-acre plot of land and is well-equipped with facilities to support technological instruction. The school has a playground that is being improved in preparation for upcoming games and sports programmes. It consists of two double-story buildings with twenty-six large rooms for administrative and instructional purposes.

Demographics
The village is mostly dominated by Bengalis and Manipuri people: among the Bengalis, Sylheti and Noakhalese, and among the Manipuri, Meitei. The local languages of Kanchanbari are Bengali and Manipuri.

Climate
The state as a whole and the village in particular has a monsoon type of climate. There are sub-tropical climatic conditions in the area. The four main seasons here are the winter season (December to February), pre-monsoon season (March to May), monsoon season (June to September), and post-monsoon season (October to November).

The climatic temperature generally ranges in between 10 °C and 35 °C. The village enjoys its coldest season from December to February followed by summer during the months from March to May. The highest temperature is generally recorded in the month of May and the lowest in January. The Southwest monsoon reaches the state in the months from June to September. The rainy season generally starts by about the end of May but thundershowers usually occur from about April to the break of the monsoon. The rainy season continues up to September. The maximum rainfall is usually recorded during the months of June – July. The months of October and November constitute the post monsoon season.

Geology
The Dupitilla, Tipam and Surma series of land formations cannot be seen here. The Dupitilla series of landform can be seen at the nearby villages Dudhpur, West Kanchanbari, Laljuri, etc. In Kanchanbari, only quatenery sediments of the Holocene Age are visible. The lithology of the soil is alluvium, represented by unconsolidated pale to dirty grey silt, silty clay, sandy clay, etc., sometimes with decomposed vegetable matter and yellowish brown, coarse river sand, gravels and concretions. The river Manu flows from a south to northward direction. The village is surrounded by the river Manu in the eastern side and Laljuri Chherra on the western side.

Transport

Roadways 
National Highway 8 (NH 8), running from Karimganj in Assam to Sabroom in Tripura, passes through the eastern side of the village. The Kumarghat-Fatikroy-Manu road passes through the heart of the village.

Railways 
Kumarghat Railway station is the nearest railway station.

Fastivals
Some of the famous festivals celebrated here annually are

 Durga Puja: Maa Durga puja is celebrated by India club, YRC, and Bazar committee Puja.
 Kali Puja: Kali Puja is celebrated by India club, YRC and Bazar committee.
 Ramthakur Utsab: Ramthakur Utsab is celebrated annually at the southern part of the bazar.
 Birth day of Thakur Anukul Chandra: it is celebrated every year at Thaku Anukul Chandra Ashram, the biggest temple in the village.
 Ras Purnima: it is celebrated at the mandap situated behind the school by the Meitei Manipuri community.
 Saraswati Puja: it is celebrated by the school DSCHSS, India club and YRC.

References

Villages in Unakoti district